The Thari also known as the Dhatki are an Indo-Aryan ethno-linguistic group who reside in the Thar Desert, which is divided between Pakistan as well as India.  The Thari live primarily in Tharparkar, a district of Sindh, parts of Kutch district of Gujarat, and Jaisalmer in Rajasthan.

Lifestyle and Culture 
The Thar live in the harsh environment of the Thar Desert, which explains why they are always running after their water, camel, donkeys, etc.  The Thari marry early, often during teenage years.  They wake up early and herd the animals with the females waking up earlier than the men.  The Thari are known for their carpet industry, and earlier in history they used to make shawls.  The Thari also celebrate Lok Mela, along with the Sindhis.  The Thari have suffered throughout history due to the environment they live in, but as the world progresses into a new era, the Tharis have been suffering even more with no cars or phones.  The music of the Thari is regarded as Rajsthani music with a "little spice" to it.  The ethnobotany of plants used by the Thari people has been considered affective by scientists.  The Thari, whether Muslim or Hindu, have always been peaceful to each other.  Some Thari women work coal mining jobs across Sindh.  In recent years, the PTI party of Imran Khan has been working to improve conditions of the Thari people.

Clothing 
The clothing of the Thar is a mix of Rajasthani and Sindhi clothing, as well as a small influence of Gujarati.  The Thari women wear Ghagra cholis, a type of Punjabi and Gujarati clothing with the Thari men wearing a turban and sometimes wearing a Shalwar Qameez.  During funerals, Thari women wear bangles and Thari men wear black dresses.

Language 

The Thari people speak the Dhatki language, a Indo-Aryan language of the Rajasthani subgroup.  The Thari also speak Sindhi and Urdu.

Notable People 
Notable Thari people include:
 Mai Bhaghi, A Thari women who sang in Sindhi and Urdu
 Fozia Soomra, A Thari Singer
 Sohail Sangi, A Thari journalist and activist working at Dawn
 Ram Singh Sodho, A member of Pakistan Muslim League (Q)
 Mahesh Kumar Malani, A member of the National Assembly of Pakistan
 Muhammad Usman Diplai, A Thari poet who wrote in Sindhi
 Jam Saqi, General Secretary of the Communist Party of Pakistan
 Arbab Ghulam Rahim, Chief Minister of Sindh
 Lal Kumar, a Thari cricketer who played for the Hyderabad Cricket Team
 Chettan Mal Arwani, A member of Pakistan Muslim League (Q)
 Bherulal Balani, A member of the Provincial Assembly of Sindh
 Agha Syed Hamid Ali Shah Moosavi, A Thari Shia cleric who is the president of Tehrik-e-Nafaz-e-Fiqah-e-Jafaria
 Vasand Thari, A Thari singer, poet, and journalist
 Mai Dhai, A Thari singer
 Gian Chand, A member of the Senate of Pakistan
 Ghulam Mohammad Lot, A member of Pakistan People's Party
 Abdul Qadir Junejo, A playwriter and columnist who wrote in Sindhi and Urdu
 Sharjeel Memon, A former member of the Provincial Assembly of Sindh
 Khatu Mal Jeewan, A member of the National Assembly of Pakistan and the Senate of Pakistan
 Krishna Kohli, A member of the Senate of Pakistan
 Rana Parshad Sodha, 18th King of Umerkot
 Rana Ratan Singh, Thari activist during British rule
 Rana Chandra Singh, One of the Founding members of the Pakistan People's Party
 Rana Hamir Singh, Current Rana of Umerkot and member of Provincial Assembly of Sindh

References 

Indo-Aryan peoples